The Forcefield Kids is the debut solo studio album by American hip hop musician Passage. It was released on Anticon in 2004. "Creature in the Classroom" was released as a single from the album. The album peaked at number 80 on the CMJ Top 200 chart, as well as number 7 on the CMJ Hip Hop chart.

Critical reception
Liam Singer of Pitchfork gave the album a 6.6 out of 10, saying: "The stark contrasts of images and styles combined with the musical assault give the impression of Passage as an ADD-addled teen in a room full of keyboards and samplers, letting loose the ravings of his sugar-soaked subconscious." Christopher R. Weingarten of CMJ New Music Monthly said, "Passage emotes about education, race and loneliness in those Anticon-oclastic beat poetics that ride the fence between astute imagery and non-sequitur." Melissa Wheeler of Exclaim! said, "there's a lot going on, which can make the album seem disorganised and uninspired, but after a few listens it becomes clear that Passage does alright in his organised mess."

Track listing

Personnel
Credits adapted from liner notes.

 Passage – vocals, production, cover design, collage
 Sole – field noise assistance (1)
 Telephone Jim Jesus – vibraphone (5), guitar (16, 21)
 Odd Nosdam – additional keyboards (8), additional computer chops, song edits, advice, cover design, layout
 Kristen Ericksen – additional computer chops, song edits, advice
 Jeremy Goody – mixing, mastering
 Bomarr – cover design

References

External links
 

2004 debut albums
Anticon albums
Passage (rapper) albums